Tephrosia virginiana, also known as goat-rue, goat's rue,  catgut, rabbit pea, Virginia tephrosia, hoary pea, and devil's shoestring is a perennial dicot in family Fabaceae. The plant is native to central and eastern North America.

Description
Its leaves are alternate and compound, usually with 8 to 15 pairs of narrow, oblong leaflets. Soft white hairs on the leaves and the stem give them a silvery, or hoary, appearance.

The flowers look similar to other flowers in the pea family and are bi-colored, with a pale yellow or cream upper petal (the standard), and pink petals on the on the bottom (the keel and wings). The flowers are grouped into clusters at the top of the stems and bloom from May to August.

The roots are long and stringy, which is probably the source of the common names catgut and devil's shoestrings.

Distribution and habitat
This plant prefers acidic soils, in part to full sun. It grows throughout the Midwest, New England and southeastern United States. Not easy to propagate because of the relationship it has with the acid soil it needs, this plant can be found in sand savannas, open woods and glades, prairies and rocky soils.

Toxicity
All tissues of this plant are toxic (containing rotenone), and should not be eaten by people or livestock. Crushed stems were previously used as a fish poison.

References

Peterson, Lee. (1977) A Field Guide to Edible Wild Plants of Eastern and Central North America. Houghton Mifflin Company, Boston. p. 82.

External links
  USDA Plants Profile for Tephrosia virginiana (Virginia tephrosia)

virginiana
Flora of the Northeastern United States
Flora of the Southeastern United States
Flora of the United States
Flora of the Appalachian Mountains
Flora of the Great Lakes region (North America)
Flora of Ontario
Plants described in 1753
Taxa named by Carl Linnaeus
Taxa named by Christiaan Hendrik Persoon